Back of My Hand is the third single by Irish singer-songwriter Gemma Hayes taken from her Night on My Side album release. The single was released in Ireland on 26 September 2002. The single was released Source Records.

Two versions of the single were released - incorporating slightly different covers and track listings. The second CD was very limited upon release and the single was only available in Ireland.

A re-worked version of the track appeared on the 2003 US release of Night on My Side. A digital version of the song appeared on iTunes on 1 March 2003.

Track listing

CD 1
All songs written by Gemma Hayes.
 "Back of My Hand"
 "Mama What's That Song"
 "Song For Julie"
- Back of My Hand Video - directed by Sam Brown

CD 2 (Ireland Only)
 "Back of My Hand"
 "My Friend Christian"
 "Let A Good Thing Go" (live and alternative version for Radio 1)

7" Vinyl
A. Back of My Hand 
B. Song For Julie

Video
The music video was directed by Sam Brown. The video was shot on location in America and features Hayes avoiding two business men dressed in suits. Towards the end of the video Hayes stumbles across a child.

Charts

References

2002 singles
Gemma Hayes songs
2002 songs
Songs written by Gemma Hayes